Army Medical College, Jashore (AMCJ) is a military medical school, established in 2014. It is located in Jashore Cantonment, in Jashore, Bangladesh. It is affiliated with Bangladesh University of Professionals. Academic activities began in January 2015.

It offers a five-year course of study leading to a Bachelor of Medicine, Bachelor of Surgery (MBBS) degree. A one-year internship after graduation is compulsory for all graduates. The degree is recognised by the Bangladesh Medical and Dental Council.

References

External links
 

Medical colleges in Bangladesh
Hospitals in Bangladesh
Educational institutions established in 2014
2014 establishments in Bangladesh